Dana Humby (born 4 October 1979) is a former association football player who represented New Zealand at international level.

Humby made her Football Ferns début in a 0–5 loss to United States on 3 October 2004, and made just one further appearance, in a 0–6 loss, also against United States on 10 October that same year.

References

1979 births
Living people
New Zealand women's association footballers
New Zealand women's international footballers
Women's association footballers not categorized by position